
Restaurant De Acht Zaligheden is a defunct restaurant in Eersel, in the Netherlands. It was a fine dining restaurant that was awarded one Michelin star in the period 1983–1995.

In the time of the Michelin stars, Henk van Tuijl was the owner and head chef. His predecessor as owner and chef was Leon Ribbens, active in 1972.

In 1979, while digging under the restaurant to create a new wine cellar, labourers found an old cesspool. In it, they found some ceramics. These artefacts were later dated by the Archaeological Institute of the Vrije Universiteit as coming from the Late Middle Ages and the Early modern period.

The restaurant closed down between 1998 and 2003, when it was mentioned as restaurant Promessa.

See also
List of Michelin starred restaurants in the Netherlands

References 

Restaurants in the Netherlands
Michelin Guide starred restaurants in the Netherlands
Defunct restaurants in the Netherlands
De Acht Zaligheden
De Acht Zaligheden